Tom Hamilton (born 8 July 1954) is an Ulster Unionist Party (UUP)  politician who was a Member of the Northern Ireland Assembly (MLA) for Strangford from 2000 to 2003.

Born in Belfast, Hamilton studied at the Methodist College, Belfast, then at Stranmillis College.  He became a teacher and in 1993 was elected to Ards Borough Council as an Ulster Unionist Party (UUP) member.  From 1999, he served as Deputy Mayor, then from 2000 to 2001 as Mayor of Ards.

Hamilton stood in the 1998 Northern Ireland Assembly election, in Strangford.  Although unsuccessful, he was co-opted in January 2001, following the death of fellow UUP member Tom Benson.  He did not defend his seat in 2003.

References

1954 births
Living people
Politicians from Belfast
Northern Ireland MLAs 1998–2003
Ulster Unionist Party MLAs
Members of Ards Borough Council
Mayors of places in Northern Ireland
People educated at Methodist College Belfast
Alumni of Stranmillis University College